"" ("There is a lovely country") is one of the two national anthems of Denmark.

History
The music was composed in 1835 by Hans Ernst Krøyer. Later, Thomas Laub and Carl Nielsen each composed alternative melodies, but neither of them has gained widespread adoption, and today they are mostly unknown to the general population.

When first published, the national anthem had twelve verses, but this was shortened to the first, third, fifth, and last verse in later editions.

Denmark is one of only two countries in the world — the other being New Zealand – with two official national anthems. Officially, "Kong Christian stod ved højen mast" is both a national and a royal anthem; it has equal status with "Der er et yndigt land", which is treated as the civil national anthem. On royal and military occasions, "Kong Christian" is performed alone, or the two national anthems are played together.

Music

Lyrics
In certain situations, for example at sporting events, only the first verse (or stanza) and the last three lines of the fourth verse are sung.

Notes

References

External links

 Aarhus Universitet - original lyrics by Oehlenschläger

European anthems
Works by Adam Oehlenschläger
Danish anthems
1835 in Denmark
1835 songs
National anthems
National anthem compositions in D major